"Prince Charming" was a number-one single in the UK Singles Chart for four weeks in September 1981 for Adam and the Ants. Written by Adam Ant and Marco Pirroni, and featuring on the album of the same name, it was Adam and the Ants' second number-one single in a row and was the fifth biggest hit of 1981.

Music video
Band member and producer Merrick (Chris Hughes), normally on drums, played a stirring riff on an open-tuned acoustic guitar throughout the song. Lead guitarist Pirroni mimed to this part on both an orchestral harp and a miniature harp in the promotional video. The music video was notable for its extravagant production compared to the videos being produced at the time.

It featured Adam Ant in a male Cinderella role, complete with moustached drag queen evil step-sisters. The sisters accept an invitation to "Come to the ball, and dance the Prince Charming", leaving Adam home doing the chores.

Sitting at a table in an old-style kitchen, Adam is surrounded by his band members, who are encouraging him: "Don't you ever/Don't you ever/Stop being dandy, showing me you're handsome." His Fairy Godmother, portrayed by Diana Dors, suddenly appears with five shirtless men dancing the "Prince Charming". With a wave of her magic wand, she transforms Adam's attire into flamboyant Regency clothes.

Adam makes a grand entrance onto the balcony at the ball, and swings down on a chandelier. He, the Ants, his Fairy Godmother, her male attendant and the invited guests of the ball dance the "Prince Charming", which became a much imitated arm-crossing dance as the song rose up the charts. Choreographer Stephanie Coleman explained that each hand movement in the Prince Charming dance had a meaning (in order: Pride, Courage, Humour, Flair) each representing an element of Adam Ant's personality. The video ends with Adam smashing a mirror, then singing the "Prince Charming, Prince Charming/Ridicule is nothing to be scared of" refrain as different characters: the Man with No Name (Clint Eastwood from the Dollars Trilogy), Alice Cooper, Sheik Ahmed Ben Hassan (Rudolph Valentino from the silent film The Sheik), and Marlon Brando as Vito Corleone from The Godfather (replaced in an alternative edit of the video by Ant's own "Dandy highwayman" from the "Stand and Deliver" video.) video included an appearance by Brian(we need the beard)Smith. The music video was one of Diana Dors' last on-screen performances.

Lyrics
According to Adam, Prince Charming is based on Beau Brummell. Pirroni described the song as "A cleverer song than any of you realise." He also said that the dance routine was initially developed when he realised that the beat of the song made it difficult to dance to in a conventional way, meaning it was unlikely to be played in discos and clubs.

Charts

Weekly Charts

Year-end charts

"War Canoe"
On 27 March 2010, Rolf Harris claimed on BBC Radio 5 Live's Danny Baker Show that an out-of-court settlement had been reached, with a large sum of royalties received, after a musicologist found "Prince Charming" to be musically identical to Harris's 1965 song "War Canoe".

References

UK Singles Chart number-one singles
Adam and the Ants songs
1981 singles
Songs written by Marco Pirroni
Songs written by Adam Ant
1980 songs
CBS Records singles
Song recordings produced by Chris Hughes (record producer)
Cultural depictions of Beau Brummell
Cultural depictions of Clint Eastwood
Cultural depictions of Marlon Brando
Cultural depictions of Rudolph Valentino